The Meaning of Life Tour was the eighth headlining concert tour from American singer Kelly Clarkson. Her first tour in three and a half years, it supported her eighth studio album Meaning of Life (2017). The tour began in Oakland, California on January 24, 2019, and concluded on March 30, 2019, in Greenville, South Carolina, visiting arenas in various cities across the United States. This was Clarkson's highest grossing tour to date.

Background
Clarkson had previously declared her intention for a concert tour to support her eighth studio album Meaning of Life, which was her first album release with Atlantic Records. Before the conclusion of the fourteenth season of The Voice and hosting the 2018 Billboard Music Awards, Clarkson revealed the tour was being "routed". On September 14, 2018, she announced tour dates with her supporting acts Kelsea Ballerini and Brynn Cartelli (winner of The Voices fourteen season from Clarkson's team), who joined her in a rendition of the album's titular track. Clarkson remarked in a statement, "Even while recording it, I couldn't wait for people to experience the music live, to not only hear it, but feel it. It has taken almost a year of planning, and I can't wait to see y'all on the road!".

Clarkson had four to five wardrobe changes, two of them being major, and each night a portion of each show was live streamed. As well as bringing Byrnn Cartelli on tour, Clarkson also brought one of her other The Voice season fourteen contestants, D.R. King. He was singing background vocals for her.

Show
The show began with the venue becoming dark and clips of Clarkson's past hits playing. Clarkson then rose up to the stage wearing a black and red ballgown, and with a spotlight on her, she sang her first single "A Moment Like This" a cappella. The show closed with her well-known hit "Since U Been Gone". In between she performed tracks off her latest album Meaning of Life, past singles, past album tracks, and covers. A portion of each show was live streamed on her Facebook page. The segment is named after her Facebook live webisodes and song: "A Minute and a Glass of Wine". Clarkson’s backup singers started off singing the song "A Minute and a Glass of Wine", with Clarkson coming out shortly after and finishing it. She then covered a song that she picked (replacing "Fan Requests" from her past two tours). Some nights, she brought out a special guest (either a musical artist or someone who has done good) to give a sneak peek of what her upcoming talk show The Kelly Clarkson Show will be like (I.E. During opening night in Oakland, she brought out Allyn Pierce a nurse who during the Camp Fire (2018) made a heroic effort by driving in the fire to rescue people and at the Nashville show Clarkson's good friend Reba McEntire was her guest, and the two performed a medley of songs). For "Miss Independent", she brought Kelsea Ballerini and Brynn Cartelli out on stage to sing the song with her.

VIP section
For this tour Clarkson had a VIP/bar stage, "A Minute + A Glass of Wine...Bar Experience" where the bar surrounded the b-stage. VIP ticket holders received things like a drink ticket, one merchandise gift signed by Clarkson, custom signed wine glasses, an invitation to the 'Meaning of Life' Lounge, and more.

Critical reception
Jim Harrington of The Mercury News says, "The concert reached the next level with the fourth selection, "Love So Soft," a standout rocker from "Meaning of Life" that shows just how much soul Clarkson can bring to the party when she has the right material to work with." And "Part of what makes Clarkson so impactful on stage is her sincerity. She comes across as someone you can trust, and even more so, someone who you'd want to hang out with."
Daily Herald journalist Sarah Harris, who attended the Salt Lake City show said that Clarkson brought down the house. Emily Gardiner of the Deseret News said, "Clarkson hasn't missed a step during her three-year hiatus from touring.", and that her "voice carried the same power and soul that fans have loved since her "American Idol" win back in 2002, reminding the audience just how incredible her voice sounds live." Tulsa World's Jimmie Tramel said, "She didn't just sing to the audience. She connected. You've probably been to a concert where unnamed superstar artist came off as trying to be some sort of higher species. Clarkson, born and raised in Texas, was engaging in a manner that made you feel like she was just glad to be barefoot and hanging out with her Oklahoma peeps."

Kendra Meinert of the Green Bay Press-Gazette said, "There was never a moment during her hour-and-45-minute show that the crowd of about 7,000 wasn't with her every step of the way, from the synchronized jumping up and down during "Stronger" to the heartbreak of "a Piece by Piece" with a lone acoustic guitar to a rendition of "Happy Birthday" for a 14-year-old fan in the crowd." Althea Legaspi of the Chicago Tribune said, "Clarskon was savvy in mostly culling crowd pleasers delivered with a down home approach driven home with her easy banter." and "her beguiling voice and personality were more than enough to fill the arena.". Thor Christensen of Guide Live who attended the Dallas show said, "Clarkson proved just how much grit she has in her gymnastic soprano. Her voice was in brilliant form all night."

Commercial performance
This was Clarkson's highest grossing tour to date, grossing $17,490,910, and selling over 275,000 tickets. All twenty-eight shows were sold out. This tour surpassed her previous highest grossing tours; The Breakaway Tour and Addicted Tour.

Set list
This set list is from the January 24, 2019, show in Oakland, California. It does not represent every show.

"A Moment Like This"
"Meaning of Life"
"Walk Away"
"Love So Soft"
"Whole Lotta Woman"
"Behind These Hazel Eyes"
"Piece by Piece"
"Breakaway"
"Because of You" / "Just Missed The Train" / "Beautiful Disaster" / "Sober" / "Good Goes the Bye" / "Would You Call That Love"
 "A Minute" 
 "Tin Man" 
"Run Run Run" 
"Move You"
"My Life Would Suck Without You"
"Heat"
"Heartbeat Song"
"Miss Independent"
Encore
"It's Quiet Uptown"
 "Never Enough" 
"Stronger (What Doesn't Kill You)"
"Since U Been Gone"

Tour dates

Personnel
Source:

Band
Kelly Clarkson – Lead vocals
Jake Botts – Saxophone
Jaco Caraco – Guitar
Jessi Collins – Backup vocalist
Lester Estelle – Drums
Aben Eubanks – Guitar 
Jason Halbert – Keyboards, piano, & musical director 
Glenn Hill – Trombone
Allison Iraheta – Backup vocalist
D.R. King – Backup vocalist 
Charles Ray – Trumpet
Bridget Sarai – Backup vocalist
Kyle Whalum – Bass

Other
AEG – promoter
Leroy Bennett – production designer 
Brandon Blackstock & Starstruck Management – manager 
Chris Dye – artist production manager
Clair Global – Audio provider
Bob Lewis – Monitor engineer 
Fraser McKeen – Lighting director 
Chris Michaelessi – FOH engineer
Messina Touring Group – promoter
Dennis Sharp – tour manager
Jay Schmitt – production manager 
Tait Towers – Staging & Props
Upstaging – Lighting & trucking
Vision Visual Inc. – video

References

External links
 

2019 concert tours
Concert tours of the United States
Kelly Clarkson concert tours